WLNI (105.9 MHz) is a commercial FM radio station licensed to Lynchburg, Virginia.  It has a talk radio format and is owned by James River Media, LLC.  The studios and offices are on Tradewynd Drive in Lynchburg.

WLNI has an effective radiated power (ERP) of 6,000 watts as a Class A station.  The transmitter is off Main Street, near the Lynchburg Expressway.

Programming
Weekdays on WLNI begin with a local news and information show, The Morning Line with Mari White and Brian Weigand.  In afternoon drive time, WLNI has a local sports show, The Sports Line with Rich Roth and Dennis Carter.  The rest of the weekday schedule is nationally syndicated talk shows:  Brian Kilmeade and Friends, The Dan Bongino Show, The Sean Hannity Show, The Ramsey Show with Dave Ramsey, The Joe Pags Show and Coast to Coast AM with George Noory.  

On weekends, WLNI has specialty shows on money, health, law, technology and real estate, some of which are paid brokered programming.  Syndicated weekend shows include: The Kim Komando Show, Bill Handel on the Law, Rich DiMuro on Tech, At Home with Gary Sullivan, Sunday Nights with Bill Cunningham and Somewhere in Time with Art Bell.  WLNI also carries Virginia Tech Hokies football and basketball.  Most hours begin with an update from Fox News Radio.

History
It was Lynchburg’s first full-time talk station on the FM dial and was owned by the Friendship Broadcasting Company. The studios were on Amhurst Highway in Madison Heights. WLNI was a network affiliate of Westwood One and ABC News Radio.

In 1998, Three Daughters Media acquired WLNI, keeping the studios in Madison Heights.  In 2004, the station was purchased by North Carolina-based Centennial Broadcasting and the studios were relocated to Midtown Lynchburg near the Plaza Shopping Center.

In 2013, Roanoke-based Mel Wheeler Broadcasting purchased WLNI to join its eight-station group.   The studios were moved to the current location in the community of Wyndhurst.

James River Media, based in Lynchburg, purchased WLNI in August 2020.  It became a stand-alone station.  James River Media re-focused WLNI on Lynchburg-area news and issues.

WLNI has received several awards from the Virginia Association of Broadcasters for its news coverage and programming over the years, including:

2012 Best Human Interest Series for “Living History: the Civil War in Central Virginia”
2010 Best Human Interest Series: “Surviving Summer with Your Kids”
2010 Best Documentary:  "Camille Remembered"
2009 and 2010: Best Morning Show:  "The Morning Line with Mari White and Brian Weigand"

References

External links
 
 

LNI
Talk radio stations in the United States
Radio stations established in 1994
1994 establishments in Virginia